Casso (Cas in local dialect, Sćjas in Friulan) is an Italian village, frazione of Erto e Casso, in the Province of Pordenone. Its population is 35. Together with Erto, its administrative seat, it forms the municipality of Erto-Casso.

Geography
The village is situated in Friuli, close to the borders with the Province of Belluno, Veneto. It was built under the Salta mountain, in front of the Toc mountain, upon the Vajont river valley. Linked with a street to the National Road 251, it is 3 km from Erto, 4 from Castellavazzo and 5 from Longarone.

History

Early history
First mentioned in 1332, it was stably inhabited from 1558 by lumberjacks from the province of Belluno. The colloquial language spoken in Casso is the bellunese, a Venetian dialect. Historically and culturally different from Erto, in which is spoken a Ladin dialect, Casso also belongs to the Diocese of Belluno-Feltre, different from the one of Erto.

The Vajont disaster

Situated upon the Vajont Dam, Casso was one of the villages involved in the disaster of October 9, 1963. Partly damaged as Erto, the village vas evacuated and in 1971 its population was transferred in Vajont, a new municipality built near Maniago. In 1966 some of the inhabitants occupied again their houses to reform the village, as done in Erto, and the comune.

References

External links

 Erto e Casso municipal website

Frazioni of the Province of Pordenone